The Tinkerbell map is a discrete-time dynamical system given by:

Some commonly used values of a, b, c, and d are

Like all chaotic maps, the Tinkerbell Map has also been shown to have periods; after a certain number of mapping iterations any given point shown in the map to the right will find itself once again at its starting location.

The origin of the name is uncertain; however, the graphical picture of the system (as shown to the right) shows a similarity to the movement of Tinker Bell over Cinderella Castle, as shown at the beginning of all films produced by Disney.

See also
 List of chaotic maps

References 
 C.L. Bremer & D.T. Kaplan, Markov Chain Monte Carlo Estimation of Nonlinear Dynamics from Time Series
 K.T. Alligood, T.D. Sauer & J.A. Yorke, Chaos: An Introduction to Dynamical Systems, Berlin: Springer-Verlag, 1996.
 P.E. McSharry & P.R.C. Ruffino, Asymptotic angular stability in non-linear systems: rotation numbers and winding numbers
 R.L. Davidchack, Y.-C. Lai, A. Klebanoff & E.M. Bollt, Towards complete detection of unstable periodic orbits in chaotic systems
 B. R. Hunt, Judy A. Kennedy, Tien-Yien Li, Helena E. Nusse, "SLYRB measures: natural invariant measures for chaotic systems"
 A. Goldsztejn, W. Hayes, P. Collins "Tinkerbell is Chaotic" SIAM J. Applied Dynamical Systems 10, n.4 1480-1501, 2011

External links
Tinkerbell map visualization with interactive source code

Chaotic maps